Naval War: Arctic Circle is a real time naval strategy game developed by Norwegian development company Turbo Tape Games and published by Swedish video game publisher Paradox Interactive. It was released on April 10, 2012. Naval War: Arctic Circle was announced at the 2011 Paradox Interactive Convention held in New York. The game is supported by the Norwegian Film Institute, Innovation Norway and the Norwegian Research Council, and is developed in close consultation with the Royal Norwegian Navy.

As of January 23, 2013, support for the game has been abandoned by Paradox and Turbo Tape Games, therefore in October 2013 the backend source code was released to the game community to allow self-support.

Plot

Naval War: Arctic Circle takes place in 2030, throughout the North Atlantic, Arctic Ocean and the Baltic Sea. The game revolves around an imagined conflict in the Arctic Circle, where melting ice caps have opened up the region to exploitation for its raw materials. There are two differing single-player campaigns, narrated and played from Russian and NATO perspectives, and a 4-part tutorial. Additionally, one-on-one multiplayer gaming is possible through Steam services.

Gameplay
The game environment consists of a 35 mil km2 map, and features dynamic weather and a day/night cycle, which can affect certain game mechanics. The game is played in real-time, and no 'pause' functionality is available. Time compression is possible up to 120x.

The game interface contains two viewports, one large and one small, which host a 2D strategic view of the playable map, and a 3D view to observe controllable units. The player can switch between the two views in the main display, and the other is shown in the smaller viewport.

Serving or near-future serving real life sensors, armaments and ordnance are also included. Units and equipment in the game have properties and statistics reflect their real life counterparts as far as research by the development team allows.

There are also civilian tankers, merchant vessels, fishing boats and passenger aircraft present in the game.

Development
Turbo Tape Games have released a short series of textual and video 'developer diaries'.

The development philosophy of the game, according to Turbo Tape Games, is that where there is potentially "a conflict between realism and gameplay, gameplay will win every time", which means that aspects of the game do not always reflect real life, albeit uncommonly. For example, "you can launch aircraft at maximum take-off weight with tailwind."

End-of-support and source code release
As of January 23, 2013, support for the game has been abandoned by Paradox and Turbo Tape Games, who released a statement saying: "Naval War: Arctic Circle has reached the end of its development, and patches or DLC for the title will no longer be produced under the Paradox Interactive brand." On October 16, 2013, the backend part of the game's source code was released to the game community under restrictive license terms.

Reception
Before release, Paradox Interactive gave out beta copies of NWAC to journalists for review purposes. The game has frequently been likened to previous naval strategy games such as Harpoon, Red Storm Rising, Dangerous Waters  and Fleet Command. The graphics have been commented on as generally lower quality than expected.

See also
Harpoon series
Command: Modern Air Naval Operations

References

External links
 

2012 video games
Grand strategy video games
Paradox Interactive games
Real-time strategy video games
Video games with Steam Workshop support
Video games developed in Norway
Video games with historical settings
Video game sequels
Windows games
Windows-only games
Commercial video games with freely available source code
Naval video games